Galina Ivanovna Tsukanova (February 26, 1942 – November 24, 2014) was a Soviet and Russian scientist and engineer. She received a PhD in Engineering Science in 1969, in addition to being a senior scientist, docent, and USSR State Prize holder.

Biography

Galina Ivanovna Tsukanova (maiden surname Tikhomirova) was born February 26, 1942, in the village of Manuilovo, Kaliningrad Oblast. In 1955, after the death of her mother, her family moved to Leningrad, where she graduated from school in 1959 and entered ITMO. Galina had graduated with honours from ITMO in 1965 with specialization in Optical Devices. During her degree she was a Lenin Scholarship holder. In 1968 she occupied the position of engineer in Department of Optic-Mechanical Devices. In 1968 Galina had received a PhD in Engineering Science, her thesis was devoted to problems of Aberrations in Space Optics. At the time, Prof. Dr. Vladimir Churilovski was her scientific supervisor.

Galina Tsukanova had been working in IMTO for many years. During her career, she occupied the following positions in Optical Devices Design Department (Mikhail Mikhaylovich Rusinov—head of the Department): Engineer (1968–70), Senior Scientist (1970-72), Docent (from 1972).

Galina Tsukanova had made a serious contribution to the Vega program, as she was the head of the group, designing optical devices. She was awarded the USSR State Prize in 1986 for that contribution. Optical devices designed by Galina Tsukanova were used for filming Halley's Comet.

She was a designer of catadioptric lenses.

Family

Father – Tikhomirov Ivan Arsenevich (1907–1981) was a technician in Manuilovo village. During World War II he volunteered for the army in the rank of Private.

Mother – Babaeva Aleksandra Vasilevna, was a shop manager in Manuilovo village.

Husband – Tsukanov Anatolii Anatolevich was born in Leningrad in the family of lieutenant-commander. In 1955 entered military academy, named after Makarov (Sevastopol). In 1958 transferred to Leningrad Institute of Precise Mechanics and Optics. Graduated in 1963 with specialization in Precise Mechanical Devices. In 1975 received a PhD degree. In 1981 became a Docent of Optical Devices Department of ITMO. From 1978 till 2004 had occupied Docent position in Optical Devices Design Department. Had made a serious contribution into high-speed filming.

Daughter – Tsukanova Olga Anatolevna was born in 1980. Doctor of Economics, Professor of Economics and Strategic Management Department of ITMO. Graduated from ITMO in 2002 with specialization in Informational Systems in Economy.

Research

Research of Galina Tsukanova was devoted to design of Space Optical Devices. She is an author of more than 80 scientific papers, and more than 17 patents.

Some of her works are:
 G. I. Tsukanova, A. V. Bakholdin, Special branches of applied optics—Study Guide.
 G. I. Tsukanova, G. V. Karpova, O. V. Bagdasarova, Applied optics—Study Guide, 2013.
 A. V. Bakholdin, G. I. Romanova, G. I. Tsukanova, Theory and Methods of Optical Devices Design—2011.

Awards
 Medal "In Commemoration of the 300th Anniversary of Saint Petersburg", 1986.
 S. P. Korolev Prize, 1985.
 USSR State Prize, 2004.

References

1935 births
Academic staff of ITMO University
Soviet physicists
20th-century Russian physicists
Scientists from Saint Petersburg
Optical engineers
Lenin Prize winners
2014 deaths